= San Pablo, Costa Rica =

San Pablo may refer to places in Costa Rica:

- San Pablo, Heredia Province
- San Pablo, Turrubares Canton in San José Province
- San Pablo, Leon Cortés Canton in San José Province
